The 30th New York State Legislature, consisting of the New York State Senate and the New York State Assembly, met from January 27 to April 7, 1807, during the third year of Morgan Lewis's governorship, in Albany.

Background
Under the provisions of the New York Constitution of 1777, amended by the Constitutional Convention of 1801, 32 Senators were elected on general tickets in the four senatorial districts for four-year terms. They were divided into four classes, and every year eight Senate seats came up for election. Assemblymen were elected countywide on general tickets to a one-year term, the whole assembly being renewed annually.

In 1797, Albany was declared the State capital, and all subsequent Legislatures have been meeting there ever since. In 1799, the Legislature enacted that future Legislatures meet on the last Tuesday of January of each year unless called earlier by the governor.

State Senator Ebenezer Purdy resigned on March 16, 1806, to avoid being expelled for bribery, leaving a vacancy in the Southern District.

In 1806, three new counties were created: Allegany County was split from Genesee County, but remained with Genesee and Ontario County in one Assembly district. Broome County was split from Tioga County, but remained with Tioga in one Assembly district. Madison County was split from Chenango County, and was apportioned two seats in the Assembly, taken from Chenango.

At this time the politicians were divided into two opposing political parties: the Federalists and the Democratic-Republicans.

In 1805, the 28th Legislature had chartered the Merchant's Bank of New York which had been founded by Federalists in competition to the Democratic-Republican Bank of the Manhattan Company. The Democratic-Republican majority of the 27th Legislature had not only refused to grant a charter, but actually ordered the Merchant's Bank to shut down by May 1805. During the next session, the bank bribed enough legislators to have the charter approved, although the Democratic-Republican leaders advocated strongly against it. Gov. Morgan Lewis spoke out in favor of granting the charter what was resented by the party leaders DeWitt Clinton and Ambrose Spencer, and soon led to the split of the party into "Lewisites" and "Clintonians".

Elections
The State election was held from April 29 to May 1, 1806. Senators James Burt (Middle D.) and Jacob Snell (Eastern D.) were re-elected. Jonathan Ward (Southern D.), Elisha Barlow (Middle D.), John Ballard, Salmon Buell, Jacob Gebhard and Nathan Smith (all four Western D.) were also elected to the Senate.  Assemblyman Benjamin Coe (Southern D.) was elected to fill the vacancy. Burt, Barlow and Snell were Lewisites, the other six were Clintonians.

Sessions
The Legislature met at the Old City Hall in Albany on January 27, 1807; and adjourned on April 7.

Lewisite Andrew McCord was elected Speaker with the help of the Federalists, with 53 votes against 40 for Clintonian Alexander Sheldon, the Speaker of the previous session. Lewisite Gerrit Y. Lansing was elected Clerk of the Assembly, defeating the Clintonian incumbent Solomon Southwick by a majority of 6 votes. On February 2, Southwick was elected Clerk of the Senate.

On February 3, 1807, the Legislature re-elected John Smith (Dem.-Rep.) to a full term in the U.S. Senate.

State Senate

Districts
The Southern District (6 seats) consisted of Kings, New York, Queens, Richmond, Suffolk and Westchester counties.
The Middle District (8 seats) consisted of Dutchess, Orange, Ulster, Columbia, Delaware, Rockland and Greene counties.
The Eastern District (9 seats) consisted of Washington, Clinton, Rensselaer, Albany, Saratoga, Essex and Montgomery counties.
The Western District (9 seats) consisted of Herkimer, Ontario, Otsego, Tioga, Onondaga, Schoharie, Steuben, Chenango, Oneida, Cayuga, Genesee, Seneca, Jefferson, Lewis, St. Lawrence, Allegany, Broome and Madison counties.

Note: There are now 62 counties in the State of New York. The counties which are not mentioned in this list had not yet been established, or sufficiently organized, the area being included in one or more of the abovementioned counties.

Members
The asterisk (*) denotes members of the previous Legislature who continued in office as members of this Legislature. Benjamin Coe changed from the Assembly to the Senate.

Employees
Clerk: Henry I. Bleecker
Solomon Southwick, from February 2, 1807

State Assembly

Districts

Albany County (6 seats)
Allegany, Genesee and Ontario counties (3 seats)
Broome and Tioga counties (1 seat)
Cayuga County (2 seats)
Chenango County (2 seats)
Clinton County (1 seat)
Columbia County (4 seats)
Delaware County (2 seats)
Dutchess County (7 seats)
Essex County (1 seat)
Greene County (2 seats)
Herkimer County (3 seats)
Jefferson, Lewis and St. Lawrence counties (1 seat)
Kings County (1 seat)
Madison County (2 seats)
Montgomery County (5 seats)
The City and County of New York (9 seats)
Oneida County (3 seats)
Onondaga County (2 seats)
Orange County (4 seats)
Otsego County (4 seats)
Queens County (3 seats)
Rensselaer County (5 seats)
Richmond County (1 seat)
Rockland County (1 seat)
Saratoga County (4 seats)
Schoharie County (2 seats)
Seneca County (1 seat)
Steuben County (1 seat)
Suffolk County (3 seats)
Ulster County (4 seats)
Washington County (6 seats)
Westchester County (4 seats)

Note: There are now 62 counties in the State of New York. The counties which are not mentioned in this list had not yet been established, or sufficiently organized, the area being included in one or more of the abovementioned counties.

Assemblymen
The asterisk (*) denotes members of the previous Legislature who continued as members of this Legislature.

Employees
Clerk: Gerrit Y. Lansing
Sergeant-at-Arms: Thomas Donnelly
Doorkeeper: Benjamin Whipple

Notes

Sources
The New York Civil List compiled by Franklin Benjamin Hough (Weed, Parsons and Co., 1858) [see pg. 108f for Senate districts; pg. 119f for senators; pg. 148f for Assembly districts; pg. 180 for assemblymen]
The History of Political Parties in the State of New-York, from the Ratification of the Federal Constitution to December, 1840 by Jabez D. Hammond (4th ed., Vol. 1, H. & E. Phinney, Cooperstown, 1846; pages 235–245)
Election result Assembly, Albany Co. at project "A New Nation Votes", compiled by Phil Lampi, hosted by Tufts University Digital Library
Partial election result Assembly, Allegany, Genesee and Ontario Co. at project "A New Nation Votes" [gives only votes from the Town of Angelica]
Partial election result Assembly, Broome and Tioga Co. at project "A New Nation Votes" [gives only votes from Tioga Co.]
Election result Assembly, Delaware Co. at project "A New Nation Votes"
Election result Assembly, Dutchess Co. at project "A New Nation Votes"
Election result Assembly, Greene Co. at project "A New Nation Votes"
Election result Assembly, Jefferson, Lewis and St. Lawrence Co. at project "A New Nation Votes" [omits votes from St. Lawrence Co.]
Election result Assembly, Kings Co. at project "A New Nation Votes"
Election result Assembly, Madison Co. at project "A New Nation Votes"
Election result Assembly, Orange Co. at project "A New Nation Votes"
Election result Assembly, Queens Co. at project "A New Nation Votes"
Election result Assembly, Richmond Co. at project "A New Nation Votes"
Election result Assembly, Rockland Co. at project "A New Nation Votes"
Election result Assembly, Suffolk Co. at project "A New Nation Votes"
Election result Assembly, Westchester Co. at project "A New Nation Votes"
Partial election result Senate, Southern D. at project "A New Nation Votes" [omits votes from New York City]
Partial election result Senate, Middle D. at project "A New Nation Votes" [omits votes from Columbia and Ulster counties]
Partial election result Senate, Western D. at project "A New Nation Votes" [gives only votes from Allegany and Madison counties]
Election result, Speaker at project "A New Nation Votes"
Election result, Council of Appointment at project "A New Nation Votes"

1806 in New York (state)
1807 in New York (state)
030
1806 U.S. legislative sessions